Clube Atlético Sorocaba, usually known as Atlético Sorocaba, is a currently inactive Brazilian football club from Sorocaba. 

The club competed in the Campeonato Brasileiro Série C several times.

The club is owned by Rev. Moon's Unification Church, as is CENE.

History
The club was founded on 21 February 1991 by the entrepreneur João Caracante Filho as a basketball club. Atlético Sorocaba became a football club on 15 March 1993 after they fused with Clube Atlético Barcelona and Estrada de Ferro Sorocabana Futebol Clube.

Atlético Sorocaba competed in the Campeonato Brasileiro Série C in 1994, 1995, 1996, 1997, 1998, 2002, 2003, and 2004. The club's best performances was in 1996, when they reached the third stage of the competition.

Atlético Sorocaba won the Copa Paulista de Futebol on 29 November 2008, after beating XV de Piracicaba in the final, at Estádio Barão de Serra Negra, Piracicaba, home of the opposing side. The club also competed in the same season's Recopa Sul-Brasileira. After beating Pelotas 2–0 in the semifinal, Atlético Sorocaba was defeated 1–0 by Brusque in the Recopa Sul-Brasileira final.

Achievements

 Copa Paulista de Futebol:
 Winners (1): 2008

References

External links
 Official club website 

Football clubs in São Paulo (state)
Inactive football clubs in Brazil
 
Unification Church affiliated organizations
Association football clubs established in 1993
1991 establishments in Brazil
Basketball teams in Brazil
Basketball teams established in 1991
Sorocaba